Someday is a compilation album by Greek keyboardist and composer Yanni, released on the Unison label in 1999.

Track listing

References

External links
Official Website

Yanni albums
1999 compilation albums